Gracjan Piotrkowski (1734 in Sandomierz – 1785 in Lipsko) was a Polish Catholic priest, teacher and writer.  Piarist educated, he was famed was his firebrand sermons and satirical poems.  In 1772 he has published a book titled "Satyr przeciwko zdaniom i zgorszeniom wieku naszego" ("A satire against ideas and deprivations of our age") containing 25 rhymed satires.

References
"Mały słownik pisarzy polskich", Warsaw 1969, 

1734 births
1785 deaths
Polish Roman Catholic priests
Polish male writers